Tranby College is a K-12, coeducational independent Uniting Church school located in Baldivis, Western Australia. Tranby College was founded in 1997, and since then, has gained more buildings and classes for their students.

References

External links 
 Tranby College

1997 establishments in Australia
Baldivis, Western Australia
Educational institutions established in 1997
Junior School Heads Association of Australia Member Schools in Western Australia
Private primary schools in Perth, Western Australia
Private secondary schools in Perth, Western Australia
Uniting Church schools in Australia